Just Love (Traditional Chinese: 老婆大人) is a TVB modern drama series broadcast in May 2005. The drama was broadcast in Singapore's MediaCorp TV Channel 8 in 2007.

Play of family background, surrounded mainly scratching between husband and wife relationship, trust and support. Diverse work and affairs, and need to be difficult to care for their children because their parents have to face the family encountered feelings and confused ...

A direct sequel, Just Love II (老婆大人II) was produced and is released in 2009 continued with Jessica Hsuan, Sunny Chan, Natalie Tong, Patrick Tang, and Selena Li, alongside Joyce Tang.

Synopsis

Lawful Woman: 
Blind-folded so that she cannot see who she is condemning, representing equality. 
A scale in her left hand to represent fairness. 
A sword in her right hand to represent righteousness and justice.

Ko Hei Man (Jessica Hsuan) is a court judge that takes her work very seriously. She believes everyone is equal before the law and judges each and every case as justly and fairly as she can. Kot Kwok Kwong (Sunny Chan) is Man's supportive husband who obediently takes care of the household duties and their son. The couple first met in England, and after a one-night stand, Man discovers she is pregnant. Kwong takes full responsibility for the baby, but the couple is left wondering if marriage was the right decision.

Kwong's sexist and old-fashioned father objects to his son's ways of always listening to his wife. He believes Kwong needs to focus on work, while Man should learn to be a house-wife. These old fashioned ways is what drove his daughter, Kot Bo-Yee (Natalie Tong), to leave home. Bo-Yee suddenly returns to Hong Kong after studying in America and Kwong soon finds out that Bo-Yee was expelled from America for charges of violence. Trying to hide from her father, Man sends Bo-Yee to go live with Dai Ji-Hung (Dave Wong), Man's ex-boyfriend. Dai Ji-Hung still has feelings for Man that he can't put down, so Bo-Yee takes it upon herself to make Hung fall in love with her instead.

Man and Kwong face many obstacles in their marriage, mainly due to Man's stubbornness and Kwong's foolishness. Man turns to Leung Sin-Sin (Selena Li), prosecuting lawyer, and yoga instructor Lo Wing-See (Fiona Yuen) for advice. Sin believes that in a marriage, there is no right and wrong and that Man and Kwong need to learn to compromise. See, however, believes that all men in the world are jerks. Meanwhile, Kwong seeks advice from So Ah-Gei (Patrick Tang), defense lawyer, and his "manly" uncle, Kot Tak Wan (Johnson Lee). Both of them tell Kwong that he needs to man up and show his wife who's in charge.

How will the couples of Man and Kwong, Sin and Gei, See and Wan, and Bo-Yee and Ji-Hung learn to work out their differences?

Cast

External links
TVB.com Just Love - Official Website 

TVB dramas
2005 Hong Kong television series debuts
2005 Hong Kong television series endings
2007 Singaporean television series debuts
2007 Singaporean television series endings
Channel 8 (Singapore) original programming